is a museum in Takayama, Gifu Prefecture, Japan, comprising exhibition rooms for fine arts, archaeological research, and history, including exhibitions of artifacts excavated from civilizations across the world and displays of the history of the old Hida Province of Japan.

The museum aims to protect and promote local culture as well as foster international exchange and understanding of ancient civilizations.

The memorial hall in the museum was established to pay homage to Kotama Okada, founder of the Mahikari organization, and also houses exhibits paying homage to his life and missions. The museum was opened in 1999 based on the tenet proclaimed by the founder, "The origin of the earth is one, the origin of the universe is one, the origin of humankind is one, and the origin of all religions is one."

References

Art museums and galleries in Japan
Museums in Gifu Prefecture
Ukiyo-e Museum
Art museums established in 1999
1999 establishments in Japan
Takayama, Gifu